This is the official list of each state's colors.

Alabama

Alabama's official colors are:
  White
  Crimson

Specifically they are same shades as those on its flag.

Alaska

Alaska does not have known official state colors.

Arizona

Arizona's official colors are:
  Blue
  Old gold

They were adopted in 1915

Arkansas

Arkansas does not have known official state colors.

California

California's official colors are:
  Blue
  Gold

First used by the University of California, Berkeley, in 1875, blue represents the sky and gold represents the California Gold Rush.

Colorado

Colorado does not have known official state colors.

Connecticut

Connecticut does not have known official state colors.

Delaware

Delaware's official colors are:
  Colonial blue
  Buff

Florida

Florida's unofficial colors are:
  Orange
  Red
  White

Orange represents the oranges that grow there (and the Seal of Florida uses the color), and red and white are used on its flag.

Georgia

Georgia's official colors are:
  Red
  White
  Gold
  Blue

They were adopted in 2004.

Hawaii

Hawaii has an official color for each of its eight main islands:
  Red (Hawaii)
  Pink (Maui)
  Golden yellow (Oahu)
  Purple (Kauai)
  Green (Molokai)
  Orange (Lanai)
  White (Niihau)
  Gray (Kahoolawe)

Idaho

Idaho's unofficial colors are:
  Red
  Green
  Gold
  Blue

Illinois

Illinois does not have known official state colors.

Indiana

Indiana's official colors are:
  Blue
  Gold

Iowa

Iowa does not have known official state colors.

Kansas

Kansas does not have known official state colors.

Kentucky

Kentucky does not have known official state colors.

Louisiana

Louisiana's official colors are:
  Blue
  White
  Gold

Maine

Maine does not have known official state colors.

Maryland

Maryland's unofficial colors are:
  Red
  White
  Black
  Gold

The colors come from the coat of arms of the Calvert and Crossland families.

Massachusetts

Massachusetts's official colors are:
  Blue
  Green
  Cranberry

They were adopted in 2005.

Michigan

Michigan does not have known official state colors.

Minnesota

Minnesota proposed in 2016 to make its official color purple in honor of the musician Prince; however, the motion did not succeed.

Mississippi

Mississippi does not have known official state colors.

Missouri

Missouri does not have known official state colors.

Montana

Montana does not have known official state colors.

Nebraska

Nebraska does not have known official state colors.

Nevada

Nevada's official colors are:
  Blue
  Silver

Blue stands for Lake Tahoe and the mountain bluebird, while silver stands for the granite of the Sierra Nevada and the silver country of northern Nevada.

New Hampshire

New Hampshire proposed in 2013 to make the colors
  Orange
  Red
  Yellow

its official state colors; however, the motion did not succeed.

New Jersey

New Jersey's official colors are:
  Buff
  Blue

New Mexico

New Mexico's unofficial colors are:
  Red
  Gold

Specifically they are same shades as those on its flag.

New York

New York's unofficial colors are:
  Blue
  Gold

North Carolina

North Carolina's official colors are:
  Red
  Blue

North Dakota

North Dakota does not have known official state colors.

Ohio

Ohio's unofficial colors are:
  Red
  White
  Blue

Specifically they are same shades as those on its flag.

Oklahoma

Oklahoma's official colors are:
  Green
  White

Oregon

Oregon's official colors are:
  Navy blue
  Gold

They were adopted in 1959.

Pennsylvania

Pennsylvania's unofficial colors are:
  Blue
  Gold

No legislation or official sources confirming Blue and Gold as Pennsylvania's official state colors are known to exist. However, due to their prominence on the state license plate and predominance on the state flag (blue and gold are incidentally predominant colors on most "seal on a bedsheet" US state flags), some sources erroneously assume their official adoption, and they have been unofficially adopted by several non-state groups.

Rhode Island

Rhode Island does not have known official state colors.

South Carolina

South Carolina's official color is:
  Indigo blue

It was adopted in 2008.

South Dakota

South Dakota does not have known official state colors.

Tennessee

Tennessee's unofficial colors are:
  Orange
  White

Texas

Texas's unofficial colors are:
  Blue
  White
  Red

Specifically they are same shades as those on its flag.

Utah

Utah's unofficial colors are:
  Bee-Utah-Full

Crayola designed a crayon for the state of Utah with this color, as part of their state color collection. HEX: #FFCC33

Vermont

Vermont proposed in 2007 to make the colors
  Green
  Gold

its official state colors; however, the motion did not succeed.

Virginia

Virginia does not have known official state colors.

Washington

No official state colors are listed the state legislature's State Symbols webpage nor in Chapter 1.20 of the Revised Code of Washington (where other official symbols are designated). Some sources list dark green and gold/yellow, the two colors specified for the flag by law since 1925.

West Virginia

West Virginia's official colors are:
  Old gold
  Blue

They were adopted in 1963.

Wisconsin

Wisconsin does not have known official state colors.

Wyoming

Wyoming proposed in 2003 to make the colors
  Brown
  Yellow

its official state colors; however, the motion did not succeed.

References

External links

U.S. state colors
Colors